Bacotoma ampliatalis is a moth in the family Crambidae. It was described by Julius Lederer in 1863. It is found in Indonesia (Ambon Island).

References

Spilomelinae
Moths described in 1863